Imbert may refer to:

People
Antonio Imbert Barrera (1920–2016), Dominican military figure and politician, President of the Dominican Republic in 1965
Barthélemy Imbert (1747-1790), French playwright, poet and novelist
Carmen Imbert Brugal (born 1955), Dominican jurist and writer
Charles Imbert (born 1952), French rower
Colm Imbert (born 1957), politician from Trinidad and Tobago 
Françoise Imbert (born 1947), French politician
Daniel Imbert (1952–2016), Mauritian footballer
Georges Imbert (1884–1950), French chemical engineer and inventor
Imbert (bishop of Riez), French cleric, bishop of Riez around 1192
Jacky Imbert (1929–2019), French gang leader
José María Bartolomé Imbert Duplessis (1798–1847), French-born Dominican military figure and politician 
Peter Michael Imbert, Baron Imbert (1933–2017), British peer, Commissioner of the Metropolitan Police Service 
Saint Laurent-Joseph-Marius Imbert, M.E.P. (1796–1839), French missionary bishop in Korea
Segundo Francisco Imbert del Monte (1837–1905), Dominican military figure and politician, Vice President of the Dominican Republic

Places
Imbert, Dominican Republic, a populated place in Puerto Plata province, Dominican Republic
Chantenay-Saint-Imbert, a commune in the Nièvre department, central France

Other uses
Imbert–Fedorov effect, an optical phenomenon 
Imbert Prize, a British award instituted in 2005 for the advancement of risk and security management 
Imbert-Terry Baronetcy, a title in the Baronetage of the United Kingdom

Surnames of French origin